Najveći uspjesi '68./73.''''' is the second album by Croatian singer Josipa Lisac. It was released in 1974.

Track listing 

 Što me čini sretnom (What makes me happy)
 Krenule su ladje (The boats have started)
 Igra valova u mom sjećanju (The game of the waves in my memories)
 Još te čekam (I'm still waiting for you)
 Život moj (My life)
 Oluja (Storm)
 Kapetane moj (My captain)
 I teče, teče vrijeme (And time is running, running)
 Dok razmišljam o nama (While I'm thinking about us)
 Na, na, na, na

External links 
 Josipa Lisac Official Website

1974 albums
Josipa Lisac albums